Grey Gargoyle (Paul Pierre Duval) is a supervillain appearing in American comic books published by Marvel Comics.

Publication history

The Grey Gargoyle first appeared in Journey into Mystery #107 (Aug. 1964) and was created by Stan Lee and Jack Kirby.

Fictional character biography
Paul Pierre Duval is a French chemist who courtesy of a chemical accident gains the ability to turn anything to stone by touching it. Turning his entire body to stone, Duval dons a mask and cape and becomes a criminal with the alias the Grey Gargoyle. Duval, however, becomes bored and decides to try to achieve immortality by confronting the Thunder God Thor and stealing his mystic hammer, Mjolnir. Thor is turned to stone in their first battle, but turns back to Don Blake when he falls over and strikes the floor with his hammer. As Blake he defeats the Gargoyle by luring him into the Hudson River in New York City, using a projection of Thor, leaving the villain buried at the bottom. The Grey Gargoyle eventually reappears after being hauled up from the river, whereupon he turns to stone two people examining him. Thinking Don Blake, who has just had the power of Thor removed from him, can help him find Thor, the Grey Gargoyle goes after him. He pursues them through the streets, becoming angry at their escaping him and finally deciding to eliminate Blake. However he is delayed by an Asgardian blinding him with an arrow that gives off light, after which the Asgardian restores the Thunder God's power. The Grey Gargoyle is incapacitated by Thor once again as he uses his hammer to trap the Grey Gargoyle by tapping a lamppost as a power source and sending a bolt which fuses the Gargoyles limbs. Odin then fully restores Thor's power.

The Grey Gargoyle appears in the title Tales of Suspense, attempting to steal an experimental device for use against Thor, but is stopped by his fellow Avenger Iron Man. The character continues to play the role of industrial saboteur in the title Captain America, attempting to steal an experimental chemical called Element X before being stopped by Captain America; the Falcon and Nick Fury. An appearance in the title Marvel Team-Up against Captain America and fellow hero Spider-Man ends with the Gargoyle being trapped in a rocket and launched into deep space.

The character reappears in the title Thor, and is revealed to have been rescued by the crew of the alien spaceship the Bird of Prey and nominated their captain. After a battle with Thor the character is lost in space once again. The Grey Gargoyle eventually returns to Earth in a meteorite in the title Avengers, and battles briefly before being defeated and imprisoned. The character reappears in the title as part of Baron Helmut Zemo's incarnation of the Masters of Evil. In an encounter with the Avenger the Black Knight, the Gargoyle grasps the hero's enchanted sword and is reverted to human form, his power temporarily neutralized.

In the title Iron Man the Gargoyle adopts the false identity of sculptor Paul St. Pierre, and intends to make a fortune in the art world by selling persons transformed to stone as authentic sculptures. The ruse, however, is discovered by Iron Man, who defeats the villain.

The character is recruited by arch villain Doctor Doom during the Acts of Vengeance storyline, and paid to neutralize the Hulk. The Hulk, however, resists the Gargoyle's power and then humiliates him by breaking his arm.

The Gargoyle appears in the title She-Hulk and in another title of Thor where he is summoned by Zarrko to fight the Thor Corps but was defeated by Beta Ray Bill. He later appeared as the pawn of an alien shapeshifter in the title Fantastic Four. The Gargoyle's power temporarily incapacitates Fantastic Four member the Thing, who recovers with the added benefit of being able to now transform between human form and his superstrong rock-like form. After another appearance in the title Thor and almost instant defeat by the god slaying entity Desak, the Gargoyle features in the title New Avengers with other criminals attempting to escape the prison facility The Raft.

After a brief appearance in the humorous title She-Hulk, the Grey Gargoyle battles heroines Spider-Woman and Ms. Marvel in the title Civil War: The Initiative; appears briefly in the fourth volume of the title New Warriors and in the Spider-Man title published under the Marvel Adventures imprint.

Grey Gargoyle is recruited to join a "crime army" formed by the villain the Hood in the title The New Avengers. During the "Dark Reign" storyline Grey Gargoyle is recruited by former Avengers foe the Grim Reaper to join a new incarnation of the Lethal Legion, who oppose criminal mastermind Norman Osborn.

During the Heroic Age storyline, it is claimed that he has a discarded and disavowed daughter named Mortar who is a member of the Bastards of Evil.

The Grey Gargoyle is later shown as an inmate of The Raft. When an EMP surge shuts down the Raft's defenses, the inmates attempt an escape. Grey Gargoyle is compelled by the Purple Man to stop a door from closing by jamming his head into the mechanism.

During the Fear Itself storyline, Grey Gargoyle is transformed via Asgardian magic into Mokk: Breaker of Faith upon lifting one of the Hammers of the Worthy that was launched to Earth by Serpent. Mokk transforms the entire population of Paris to stone. When Iron Man intervenes, Mokk damages his armor and energy supply, forcing him to flee, and also fends off attacks from Detroit Steel, Sasha Hammer and Rescue. Mokk is reverted to Grey Gargoyle by the end of the storyline, and the people of Paris were returned to normal by Odin.

During the Avengers: Standoff! storyline, Grey Gargoyle was an inmate of Pleasant Hill, a gated community established by S.H.I.E.L.D.

During the Opening Salvo part of the Secret Empire storyline, Grey Gargoyle is recruited by Baron Helmut Zemo to join the Army of Evil.

In a lead-up to the Sins Rising arc, Count Nefaria using a wheelchair later forms his latest incarnation of the Lethal Legion with Grey Gargoyle, Living Laser, and Whirlwind in a plot to target the Catalyst. At Empire State University, Dr. Curt Connors reveals the Catalyst to the crowd when the Lethal Legion attacks. While Grey Gargoyle and Whirlwind attack the people present, Living Laser helps Count Nefaria to operate the Catalyst. Spider-Man shows up and has a hard time fighting them due to the fact that his mind was focused on what a revived Sin-Eater did to Overdrive. Sin-Eater shows up and starts using the same gun he used on Overdrive on Whirlwind and Grey Gargoyle while taking their powers. Sin-Eater used Grey Gargoyle's abilities to petrify Spider-Man. All four of them were sent to Ravencroft where they started to act like model inmates.

As a side-effect of Sin-Eater's suicide upon copying Madame Web's precognition revealed that Kindred was using them, Grey Gargoyle and the rest of the Lethal Legion regained their sins and are among the villains that went on a rampage.

During the Sinister War storyline, Kindred revived Sin-Eater again and one of the demonic centipedes that emerged from his body took possession of Grey Gargoyle, making him one of the members of the Sinful Six.

Powers and abilities
During an experiment, Paul Duval spilled an unknown organic chemical compound on his right hand, causing a mutagenic reaction that permanently transformed the hand into living stone. As a result, Duval can turn any matter touched with his "stone" hand to a similar substance, with the effect lasting for approximately one hour.

Duval can also use the effect to transform himself into a being of living stone - with no loss of mobility - possessing superhuman strength and durability.

Duval also has a master's degree in chemistry.

In other media

Television
 The Grey Gargoyle appears in the "Mighty Thor" segment of The Marvel Super Heroes, voiced by Chris Wiggins.
 The Grey Gargoyle appears in Iron Man, voiced by Ed Gilbert, with additional dialogue provided by Jim Cummings. This version is a servant of the Mandarin and serves as a recurring villain in the first season before Iron Man captures him in the second season and remands him to the Vault.
 The Grey Gargoyle appears in the Iron Man: Armored Adventures episode "Doomsday" as a Makluan Guardian created by the original Mandarin to guard one of his Makluan rings and test potential successors. However, Doctor Doom destroyed the Grey Gargoyle off-screen and claimed the Makluan Ring before the Mandarin's successor, Gene Khan, could.
 The Grey Gargoyle appears in The Avengers: Earth's Mightiest Heroes, voiced by Troy Baker. Introduced in the episode "The Man in the Anthill" as an inmate of the Big House, Grey Gargoyle escapes in the episode "Breakout, Part 1" alongside his fellow inmates. As of the episode "This Hostage Earth", Grey Gargoyle joined the Masters of Evil and helps the Enchantress steal Karnilla's Norn Stones. After he petrifies the latter, the former has the Executioner "reward him" off-screen. When the other Masters of Evil ask what happened, Enchantress claims Grey Gargoyle "didn't make it".

Video games
 Grey Gargoyle appears in The Amazing Spider-Man and Captain America in Dr. Doom's Revenge!.
 Grey Gargoyle appears as a boss in Marvel: Ultimate Alliance, voiced by Tom Kane. This version is a former member of Doctor Doom's Masters of Evil who joined the Mandarin in leaving the group when the latter failed to take command.
 Grey Gargoyle appears as a boss in the PSP, PS2, and Wii versions of Marvel: Ultimate Alliance 2, voiced by Joe Roseto.
 Grey Gargoyle appears as a boss in Marvel: Avengers Alliance.

References

External links
 Grey Gargoyle at Marvel.com
 Grand Comics Database Project's article on the issue containing the Grey Gargoyle's debut

Comics characters introduced in 1964
Characters created by Jack Kirby
Characters created by Stan Lee
Fictional chemists
Fictional French people
Marvel Comics characters with superhuman strength
Marvel Comics mutates
Marvel Comics scientists
Marvel Comics supervillains
Thor (Marvel Comics)